Soekarno ( — "Indonesia's Independence") is a 2013 Indonesian biographical film directed by Hanung Bramantyo and written by Ben Sihombing. This film tells the story of the life of the late Sukarno, the first president of Indonesia. Sukarno, who was born with the name "Kusno", was one of the major figures who played an important part in the fight for Indonesia's independence from Dutch colonial rule. This film stars Ario Bayu as Sukarno.

On 13 December 2013, the Central Jakarta Business Management Court (PTUN) acceded to an injunction made by one of Sukarno's daughters, Rachmawati Soekarnoputri, to halt the film's release. Some film critics had criticised the film for being too commercialised and taking liberties in its depiction of historical events and characters. Subsequently however, on 7 January 2014, the PTUN decided to overturn its earlier decision and allow the film to be shown.

The film was selected as Indonesia's entry for the Best Foreign Language Film at the 87th Academy Awards, but was not nominated.

Plot
Soekarno is based on the life of Sukarno, and covers the period from his childhood until his historic Proclamation of Indonesian Independence. In 1931, the Dutch East Indies government in Java Island captures Sukarno, an aspiring young nationalist who wants to free Indonesia from Dutch colonial rule. He is then placed in Banceuy Prison in Bandung, Indonesia. Sukarno finds a way to fight back by delivering his famous defense oration "Indonesia Accuses!" (Indonesia Menggugat) in his trial at Bandung Laandraad Courthouse.

Cast

 Ario Bayu - "Soekarno"
 Lukman Sardi - Hatta
 Mathias Muchus - Hassan Din
 Henky Solaiman - Koh Ah Tjun
 Ria Irawan - Prostitute
 Emir Mahira - "Soekarno" (Teen)
 Aji Santosa - "Soekarno" (Kid)
 Tika Bravani - Fatmawati
 Sujiwo Tejo - Soekemi
 Michael Tju - Emperor Hirohito
 Ferry Salim - Sakaguchi
 Widi Dwinanda - Ratna Djoeami
 Agus Kuncoro - Gatot Mangkuprojo
 Timo Scheunemann - Letkol Hoogeband
 Maudy Kusnaedi - Inggit Garnasih
 Tanta Ginting - Sjahrir
 Norman Rivianto Akyuwen - Dr. Waworuntu
 Stefanus Wahyu - Sayuti Melik
 Elang - Kartosuwiryo
 Agus Mahesa - Ki Hadjar Dewantara
 Hamid Salad - Achmad Soebardjo
 Noel Kevas - Dr. Radjiman Wediodiningrat
 Budiman Sudjatmiko - Suyudi
 Theo - Oto Iskandar di Nata
 Nelly Sukma - Kartika
 Husni - Sujatmoko
 Muhammad Abbe - Wikana
 Fajar - Kyai Zaenal Mustofa
 Uchida - Nishijima
 Susumu - Hitoshi Imamura
 Roza - HOS Tjokroaminoto
 Diel Sriyadi - Asmara Hadi
 Ade Firman Hakim - Chaerul Saleh
 Alex - Latief Hendraningrat
 Patton Otlivio Latupeirissa - Riwu
 Toyik - Ki Bagus Hadikusumo
 Anto Galon - Musso
 Argo - Sukarni
 Kedung - Subadio
 Anta - Kyai Wahid Hasyim
 Rully Kertaredjasa - Fatmawati's Mother
 Ganesh - Maskoen
 Helmy Nonaka - Nakayama
 Mia - Mien Hessel
 Suzuki - Admiral Tadashi Maeda
 Ayu Laksmi - "Soekarno's" Mother
 Moch. Achir - Dr. Soeharto
 Keio Pamudji - Kumakichi Harada

Production
In September 2013, Sukarno's daughter, Rachmawati Soekarnoputri, said that she had felt betrayed by the production studio MVP Pictures and resisted the release of the movie production in its current form. She wanted actor Anjasmara to play Sukarno in the film, but the director, Hanung Bramantyo, stuck to his choice of Ario Bayu. However, Rachmawati felt that Ario did not meet her expectations in his portrayal of her father. She had also complained that she was not permitted to give directions or provide feedback on Ario's presentation and interpretation of the gestures and mannerisms of the lead character, something she felt was necessary for him to better portray her father. On 23 September 2013, the dispute came to a head with Rachmawati reporting Hanung Bramantyo to the police on allegations of defamation. At the same time, Hanung publicly stated that he believed Rachmawati's motive for the public dispute with him was purely to seek publicity and popularity for herself. The movie's release went ahead despite the dispute. On his part, the director believed that the movie was historically accurate. "I will continue to screen Sokarno because there is nothing wrong with the movie," he said in September 2013. He said that Rachmawati only had the right to give her advice but not to make any actual decisions concerning the film itself. He also said that matters concerning the making of a film were the sole prerogative of the director.

See also
 List of submissions to the 87th Academy Awards for Best Foreign Language Film
 List of Indonesian submissions for the Academy Award for Best Foreign Language Film

References

External links

2013 films
2010s Indonesian-language films
Films shot in Indonesia
Films directed by Hanung Bramantyo
Indonesian biographical films
Sukarno
2010s biographical films